This is a list of Brigham Young University Cougars football players in the NFL draft.

Key

Selections

Notable undrafted players
Note: No drafts held before 1936

References

BYU

BYU Cougars NFL draft